Iman Mohammadi is an Iranian Greco-Roman wrestler.

in 2022, Mohammadi won a bronze medal in the 63 kg event at Asian Championships.

Mohammadi won gold medal at World U23 Wrestling Championships in category 63 kg.

References

External links 
 
 

Living people
People from Izeh
Iranian male sport wrestlers
Asian Wrestling Championships medalists
Sportspeople from Khuzestan province
20th-century Iranian people
21st-century Iranian people
Year of birth missing (living people)